Dim is the fourth studio album by Japanese rock band the Gazette. It was released on July 15, 2009, in Japan. It includes the three lead up singles: "Guren", "Leech", and "Distress and Coma". The album scored number two on the Oricon Daily Charts and number five on the Oricon Weekly Charts, selling 37,797 copies in its first week.

Track listing

DVD (limited edition only)
 "The Invisible Wall" Music Clip
 "The Other Side of Dim" A collection of recording clips from the studio.

The Limited Edition sold at Tower Records also came packaged with a Car Bumper Sticker, 5 Postcards and a Poster

References

External links
 PS Company Official Website
 King Records Official Website

2009 albums
The Gazette (band) albums